Tsizgari (Dargwa: ЦӀизгъари) is a rural locality (a selo) and the administrative centre of Tsizgarinsky Selsoviet, Dakhadayevsky District, Republic of Dagestan, Russia. The population was 353 as of 2010. There are 3 streets.

Geography 
Tsizgari is located 11 km northeast of Urkarakh (the district's administrative centre) by road. Meusisha and Buskri are the nearest rural localities.

Nationalities 
Dargins live there.

References 

Rural localities in Dakhadayevsky District